The 2007 Salford City Council election took place on 3 May 2007 to elect members of Salford City Council in England. One third of the council was up for election and the Labour party kept overall control of the council. Overall turnout was 29.36%.

After the election, the composition of the council was:

Election result

|}

Ward results

Barton

Boothstown and Ellenbrook

Broughton

Cadishead

Claremont

Eccles

Irlam

Irwell Riverside

Kersal

Langworthy

Little Hulton

Ordsall

Pendlebury

Swinton North

Swinton South

Walkden North

Walkden South

Weaste & Seedley

Winton

Worsley

References

2007
2007 English local elections
2000s in Greater Manchester